The 2011 Mississippi State Bulldogs football team represented Mississippi State University in the 2011 NCAA Division I FBS football season. The team was coached by Dan Mullen, who was in his third season with Mississippi State. The Bulldogs played their home games at Davis Wade Stadium at Scott Field in Starkville, Mississippi and compete in the Western Division of the Southeastern Conference (SEC). They finished the 2011 season with a 7–6 overall play, 2–6 in SEC play, placing fifth in West Division, and were invited for Music City Bowl, where they defeated Wake Forest.

Personnel

Coaching staff
In the week following the Gator Bowl victory, several changes were made to the Mississippi State coaching staff. Defensive coordinator and linebackers coach Manny Diaz resigned his position to serve in the same position for Texas as the replacement for Will Muschamp. Co-defensive coordinator and defensive line coach Chris Wilson was promoted to defensive coordinator to replace Diaz on January 10. At that time, Angelo Mirando was promoted from graduate assistant to wide receivers coach to replace Mark Hudspeth who had resigned earlier to accept the head coaching position at UL Lafayette. Geoff Collins was hired on January 12 to serve as co-defensive coordinator and linebackers coach to fill the vacant position made when Wilson was promoted.

Recruiting class

Schedule

Schedule Source:

Rankings

Game summaries

2011 Egg Bowl

    
    
    
    
    
    

Mississippi State wore new uniforms for the game that featured gold numbers, gold shoes and "Hail State" replacing each of the player's last names on the back of the jersey.

References

Mississippi State
Mississippi State Bulldogs football seasons
Music City Bowl champion seasons
Mississippi State Bulldogs football